Mobile collaboration is a technology-based process of communicating using electronic assets and accompanying software designed for use in remote locations. Newest generation hand-held electronic devices feature video, audio, and telestration (on-screen drawing) capabilities broadcast over secure networks, enabling multi-party conferencing in real time (although real time communication is not a strict requirement of mobile collaboration and may not be applicable or practical in many collaboration scenarios).

Differing from traditional video conferencing, mobile collaboration utilizes wireless, cellular and broadband technologies enabling effective collaboration independent of location. Where traditional video conferencing has been limited to boardrooms, offices, and lecture theatres, recent technological advancements have extended the capabilities of video conferencing for use with discreet, hand-held mobile devices, permitting true mobile collaborative possibilities.

Scope 
The scope of mobile collaboration takes into account a number of elements that continue to evolve in their sophistication and complexity: video, audio and telestration capabilities, conferencing and telepresence systems, collaboration tools, transmission technologies, and mobility.

Forecasts 
Cisco Systems predicts "two-thirds of the world's mobile data traffic will be video by 2015." The Unified Communications Interoperability Forum (UCIF), a non-profit alliance of technology vendors states that "one important driver for the growth of UC (unified communications) is mobility and the remote worker. No segment is growing faster than mobile communications, and virtually every smart phone will be equipped with video chat, IM, directory, and other UC features within a few years."

Impact on industry 
To date, the use of mobile collaboration technology extends to industries as diverse as manufacturing, energy, healthcare, insurance, government and public safety. Mobile collaboration allows multiple users in multiple locations the ability to synergistically combine their input while working towards the resolution of problems or issues in today’s complex work environments. This can be done in real time with advanced video, audio and telestrator capabilities, comparable to working together in the same room but without the associated expense and downtime typically involved in getting the experts to remote locations.

Manufacturing 
Manufacturers of all kinds use mobile collaboration technology in a number of ways. Recent trends in globalization and outsourcing in particular, have meant that companies need to communicate with employees, suppliers, and customers the world over. The flexibility of hand-held mobile collaboration devices allow real-time communication to take place at any location where products are being designed, built, and inspected, such as an automotive assembly plant a continent away. Improved communication through mobile collaboration affects many aspects of complex manufacturing such as production line maintenance, supply chain management and equipment field service.

Energy 
Companies in the energy sector face unique challenges due to, for example, the vast distances between a head office and the remote, harsh environment of an offshore oil rig, as well as the often inadequacies or absence of  necessary transmission networks. Recent advancements in mobile collaboration technology and transmission networks are making it possible for employees in these situations to collaborate in secure and reliable ways with colleagues thousands of miles away. The use of mobile collaboration in the energy sector is enabling companies to conduct remote inspections, safety audits, maintenance, repair and overhaul work, as well as IT/communication infrastructure troubleshooting.

Healthcare 
Although telemedicine technology has been in use for a number of years in the healthcare sector, mobile collaboration technology extends these capabilities to locations now reachable through the use of hand-held devices such as a remote community, long-term care facility, or a patient’s home. Healthcare professionals in multiple locations can together view, discuss, and assess patient issues. The use of mobile collaboration technology within the healthcare sector has the potential to improve the quality and access to care, while making its delivery more cost-effective.

Education 
Mobile collaboration technology might also be used for remote education. From one on one tutoring to large classes it has many uses. Homeschooling could really benefit from this technology as you participate in a lecture from anywhere in the world. Most useful you can record your classes or lectures and review them. Internet schools, including higher education, will most certainly also benefit from this development in mobile education. Though these methods are not widely used they are quite useful and most likely will become widely popular.

Franchise businesses 
Mobile collaboration between franchiser and franchisee allows modern technology to be used to allow a better flow of communications similar to face-to-face, albeit remotely via video/voice media such as smartphones, tablets, iPhones, iPads, etc. to be collectively used without requiring one party to travel to another location.  This in turn reduces travel time and expenses not to mention better and quicker modes of communication.

Franchisers who have several hundred franchisees find it an absolute must.

See also 
List of video telecommunication services and product brands
Virtual collaboration
Visual networking

References 

Collaboration
Mobile technology
Teleconferencing
Videotelephony